Mark Tandy is the name of:

Mark Tandy (actor) (born 1957), Irish film and television actor
Mark Tandy (footballer) (1892–1965), member of the Australian Football Hall of Fame
Mark Tandy (RAN officer), current Royal Australian Navy officer, and former Warrant Officer of the Navy